Abel Gebor (born August 27, 1990) is a Liberian footballer who currently plays for Bhayangkara Surabaya United.

College and amateur
Gebor had a short spell in college soccer, spending time with Tyler Junior College and Lon Morris College.  In 2010, Gebor played three games for Fort Lauderdale Schulz Academy in the USL Premier Development League.

Professional
On March 13, 2012, Gebor signed with NASL club Fort Lauderdale Strikers.  He made his debut on April 25 in a 3–2 win against the Puerto Rico Islanders. Gebor played in the Finnish top flight with Honka in 2014 before moving to Tërbuni Pukë in Albania during the 2015 transfer period.

National team
Abel Gebor got called to play for his motherland Liberia during the country away fixture against Togo on June 14, 2015 in Lome, the capital of Togo. The hard working defensive midfielder earned the trust of Lone Star coach James Debbah during the national team two international test matches in Ghana ahead of the Togo clash. He played 20 minutes of the 2–1 away defeat for the Liberian national team against Togo in the 2017 African Cup of Nations qualification game, but he was very impressive and former FIFA 1995 World Best footballer George Weah praised the defensive midfielder speeding ability.

Lone Star coach James Debbah recently called Abel Gebor to help qualified the home base Lone Star team over Guinea in the CHAN qualification game, but they settled 1–1 in Monrovia on July 5, 2015, The local Lone Star needed 2–0 home win but the game ended 1–1. but Abel was one of the best player on the best on Sunday. Gebor came on during the 81st minute against Guinea Bissau on October 13, 2015 when Liberia won 1–3 through William Jebro hat-trick. Liberia advanced to the round two of the Russia 2018 qualification stage.

References

External links
 Fort Lauderdale Strikers bio
 

1990 births
Living people
Liberian footballers
Liberian expatriate footballers
Floridians FC players
Fort Lauderdale Strikers players
Expatriate soccer players in the United States
USL League Two players
North American Soccer League players
People from Sinoe County
Liberia international footballers
Association football midfielders